The Cape conger (Conger wilsoni) is a conger of the family Congridae, found in the Indo-Pacific region. Its length is up to 1 m.

References

 
 Tony Ayling & Geoffrey Cox, Collins Guide to the Sea Fishes of New Zealand,  (William Collins Publishers Ltd, Auckland, New Zealand 1982) 

cape conger
Marine fish of South Africa
Taxa named by Marcus Elieser Bloch
Taxa named by Johann Gottlob Theaenus Schneider
cape conger